The women's heptathlon event at the 2015 European Athletics U23 Championships was held in Tallinn, Estonia, at Kadriorg Stadium on 9 and 10 July.

Medalists

Results

Final
9/10 July

Participation
According to an unofficial count, 14 athletes from 11 countries participated in the event.

References

Heptathlon
Combined events at the European Athletics U23 Championships